France is the host nation of the 2024 Summer Olympics in Paris from 26 July to 11 August 2024. French athletes have appeared in every Summer Olympic Games of the modern era, alongside Australia, Great Britain, Greece, and Switzerland.

Competitors
The following is the list of number of competitors in the Games. Note that reserves in field hockey, football, and handball are not counted:

Athletics

French track and field athletes achieved the entry standards for Paris 2024, either by passing the direct qualifying mark (or time for track and road races) or by world ranking, in the following events (a maximum of 3 athletes each):

Track and road events

Equestrian

As the host nation, France automatically entered a full squad of equestrian riders each to the team dressage, eventing, and jumping competitions at the Games.

Dressage

Qualification Legend: Q = Qualified for the final based on position in group; q = Qualified for the final based on overall position

Eventing

Jumping

Football

Summary

Men's tournament

As the host nation, France men's football team directly qualified for the Olympic tournament.

Team roster
 Men's team event – one team of 18 players

Women's tournament

As the host nation, France women's football team directly qualified for the Olympic tournament.

Team roster
 Women's team event – one team of 18 players

Gymnastics

Artistic 
As the host nation, France automatically receives a guaranteed place each in the men's and women's artistic gymnastics at the Games.

Men

Women

Rhythmic 
As the host nation, France automatically receives a guaranteed place each in the individual and group all-around competition at the Games.

Trampoline 
As the host nation, France automatically receives a guaranteed place each in the men's and women's trampoline at the Games.

Handball

Summary

Men's tournament

As the host nation, France men's national handball team directly qualified for the Olympic tournament.

Team roster
 Men's team event – 1 team of 14 players

Women's tournament

As the host nation, France women's national handball team directly qualified for the Olympic tournament.

Team roster
 Women's team event – 1 team of 14 players

Shooting

As the host nation, France automatically receives a minimum of twelve quota places with one in each of the individual shooting events. Additionally, a shooter qualified for one event may compete in others without affecting the quotas if he or she obtains a minimum qualifying score (MQS) from 14 August 2022 to 9 June 2024.

Men

Women

Surfing

As the host nation, France reserves a single quota place for each gender in the men's and women's shortboard surfing events.

Triathlon

As the host nation, France reserves four quota places with two for each gender in the individual and mixed relay triathlon events.

Individual

Relay

References

Nations at the 2024 Summer Olympics
2024
2024 in French sport